The following is a list of the number-one music videos of 2016 on the weekly Billboard China V Chart. The chart ranks weekly most viewed music videos using data from Chinese video-sharing site YinYueTai (YYT).

Chart history

References

YinYueTai
China V Chart
China V Chart
Chinese music industry
V Chart 2016
China Videos 2016